The Vermont Open is the Vermont state open golf tournament, open to both amateur and professional golfers. It is organized by the Vermont Chapter of the New England section of the PGA of America.

History 
Austin Straub won the 1976 event. Peter Teravainen won the 1981 tournament.

Lake Morey Resort hosted the tournament from 1955 to 2008. The 2009 event was played at the St. Johnsbury Country Club. In 2010, Lake Morey Resort hosted the tournament again, where the tournament is still held today.

Winners

this list is incomplete
2022 Berk Harvey
2021 Garth McGee
2020 No tournament
2019 Chris Wiatr
2018 Alex Rainville
2017 Peter French
2016 Spencer Mellon
2015 Hunter Stone
2014 Richy Werenski
2013 Michael Welch
2012 Rich Berberian, Jr.
2011 Marc-Etienne Bussieres
2010 Michael Welch
2009 Brent Paladino (amateur)
2008 Jim Renner
2007 Trevor Murphy (amateur)
2006 Brent Wanner
2005 Michael Harris
2004 Sean O'Hair
2003 Rodney Butcher
2002 Chris Congdon
2001 Rodney Butcher
2000 David Gunas, Jr.
1999 Peter Morgan
1998 Joe Cioe
1997 Sean Duffy
1996 John Elliott
1995 Rodney Butcher
1994 Jeff Grygiel
1993 Andrew Pitts
1992 Kevin Giancola
1991 Jeff Lewis
1990 Rich Parker
1989 Bill Ziobro
1988 Wilhelm Winsnes
1987 Dana Quigley
1986 Dana Quigley
1985 Jeff Lewis
1984 Bob Beauchemin

References

External links
PGA of America – New England section
PGA of America – New England section – Vermont chapter
List of winners (1984+)

Golf in Vermont
PGA of America sectional tournaments
State Open golf tournaments
Recurring sporting events established in 1984